Carnival of Huanchaco (spanish:Carnaval de Huanchaco ), is a summer festival held each year in Huanchaco, one of the most visited beaches of Trujillo city, in northern Peru. The carnival is renowned for a lack of alcohol and an early finish. Stories of fire parties on the beach are unfounded. It is organized by the Club Huanchaco, consists of several activities including the crowning of the queen, surf contest, luau party, creativity in the sand, championships of Caballito de totora, the carnival parade among others, by 2012 the carnival parade was held on 25 February.

Description
The carnival has been held since the beginning of the 20th century, villagers performed a carnival in Huanchaco emulating the famous Venetian Carnival by that time, with the passing of time and the new generations it became organized by the Club Huanchaco, consists of several events and activities including the crowning of the queen, surf contest, luau party, creativity in the sand, championships of Caballito de totora, the carnival parade among others, by 2012 the carnival parade was held on 25 February.

Events
The principal events are:

Presentation of queens
Luau party
Traditional Parade, It takes place in some of the principal  streets of Huanchaco city.
Palo Cilulo, The people dance around a tree decorated with presents and they turns to cut the tree little by little until it falls down. When this happens people come to the tree to take the presents while people plays with water and some colored creams for their faces. Generally the dances in the palo cilulo are entertained by bands of musicians with huayno music.

Characters of the festival
The principal characters are:

Queen of carnival she is the queen of the festival.
Troupes
Allegorical cars
Bands of musicians, they animate the dances in the carnival.

Gallery

See also
Trujillo Spring Festival
San Jose Festival
Trujillo Book Festival
Trujillo
Santiago de Huamán
Victor Larco Herrera District

References

External links

Location of Huanchaco (Trujillo city), place of the carnival

Festivals in Trujillo, Peru